Diana Brunel (born 7 December 1981) is a French former professional tennis player.

A right-handed player from Nice, Brunel featured as a wildcard in the women's doubles main draw at the 2006 French Open, partnering Florence Haring. 

Brunel won a total of eight titles on the ITF Women's Circuit, four in singles and four in doubles.

ITF finals

Singles: 7 (4–3)

Doubles: 6 (4–2)

References

External links
 
 

1981 births
Living people
French female tennis players
Sportspeople from Nice